Julie Angus (née Wafaei, born 1974) is a Canadian rower, adventurer, writer, cyclist, and entrepreneur, married to the explorer Colin Angus.

Julie’s undergraduate degree is from McMaster University, honours in biology and psychology; she graduated in 1997. Her Masters of Science is from the University of Victoria, where she specialized in molecular biology. She also studied at the University of Leeds for a year. After graduation she worked in the area of venture capital, technology transfer, and business development. She met Colin Angus in 2003, and they were married in 2007. Julie and Colin have two sons: Leif, born September 2010, and Oliver, born June 2014.

Julie has completed a number of adventures that include being the first woman to row across the Atlantic Ocean from mainland to mainland, cycling and rowing 7,000 km (4,350 miles) from Scotland to Syria and organizing a National Geographic sponsored expedition to research the history of the olive tree. Julie has received numerous awards including the National Geographic Adventurer of the Year award, University of Victoria Distinguished Alumni Award, and McMaster University Young Alumni Award. Julie has written three books, Rowboat in a Hurricane (2008), Rowed Trip (2009) and Olive Odyssey (2014), and is a professional speaker.
 
Julie has pursued multiple entrepreneurial activities and is currently the CEO and co-founder of Open Ocean Robotics, a company she founded with her husband Colin Angus to develop autonomous energy-harvesting boats that are equipped with sensors, camera, and communication devices for offshore research. In 2018, she was selected as one of six finalists in the Women in Cleantech Challenge and was awarded $800,000. Previously, she and Colin also founded Angus Rowboats, a company that designs and produces robotically cut kits for rowboats and small sailboats.

Adventures

Crossing the Atlantic Ocean
Julie is the first woman to row the Atlantic Ocean from mainland to mainland. Her Atlantic row was part of an expedition with her then-fiancé Colin Angus to circumnavigate the Northern hemisphere entirely by human power. She accompanied Colin Angus for half of the expedition. 

For her achievement Julie and Colin Angus jointly received the Adventurer of the Year Award from National Geographic Adventure. She co-produced a documentary and wrote a book titled "Rowboat in a Hurricane: My Amazing Journey Across a Changing Atlantic Ocean" , detailing her exploits.

Scotland to Syria
In 2008 Julie and Colin Angus, completed a trip from northernmost Scotland to Syria, covering 7,000 km (4,350 miles) of rivers and roads. Each used a separate rowboat on the water sections and portaged using bicycle-trailer systems between waterways.  This expedition was described in their book "Rowed Trip, From Scotland to Syria by Oar" published in 2009 , as well as a film titled "Rowed Trip."

Olive Odyssey

Also in 2011, Julie and Colin Angus and their young son Leif sailed from Spain to the Middle-East, retracing the domestication of the olive tree.  Their adventure is described in Julie's book, "Olive Odyssey: Searching for the Secrets of the Fruit that Seduced the World"

Open Ocean Robotics
With Colin Angus Julie has launched a new company called Open Ocean Robotics.  The purpose of the company is to develop autonomous boats powered by wind and/or solar power capable of deep ocean travel. Julie won an $800,000 award from Natural Resources Canada and the MaRS Discovery District for the Woman in Cleantech Challenge to develop prototypes and demonstrate feasibility .

Recognition
 Adventurer of the Year Award 2007 from National Geographic Adventure presented to Julie and Colin 
 Named as one of North America’s leading adventurers by Explore magazine.
 Listed as One of Canada Greatest Explorer by Canadian Geographic in 2015
 Listed as One of Canada’s Greatest Women Explorers by Canadian Geographic in 2016
 Awarded University of Victoria Distinguished Alumni Award in 2018,
 Awarded McMaster University Young Alumni Award
 Canadian Geographic Fellow
 John P. McGovern Lectureship Award in 2017

References

External links
Angus Adventures Website
National Geographic Adventure - Adventurers of the Year Award 2006

1974 births
Living people
Canadian female rowers
Ocean rowers
Canadian female cyclists